"Rock It" is the debut single by Minneapolis band Lipps Inc. and the lead single from their debut album Mouth to Mouth. The song peaked at No. 64 on the Billboard Hot 100 in August 1980.

Background
"Rock It" had become a hit in band leader Steven Greenberg's home state of Minnesota and caught the attention of Casablanca Records. It led to the band being signed by the label and the release of the band's debut album and single nationally. The song failed to chart in its initial release, but following the worldwide success of "Funkytown", the single was re-released and this time reached No. 64 on the Hot 100 singles chart in the US.

Cash Box said that "Cynthia Johnson's sleek vocal swoops are nicely backed by arching strings and smart funk bass."

Samples
The song has been sampled in three songs: "Euro (Dave Armstrong Mix)" by Steve Angello, "Vsaika Nedelia" by Deep Zone Project, and "Space Disco" by J Paul Getto.

References

1979 songs
1979 singles
1980 singles
Lipps Inc. songs
Casablanca Records singles